Carrizo Valley is a valley between the Vallecito Mountains and Carrizo Badlands to the north and the Tierra Blanca Mountains, Jacumba Mountains and Coyote Mountains on the south, in San Diego County, California.

References

Valleys of San Diego County, California